Mela is a 1986 Pakistani Punjabi language action film, directed by Hassan Askari and produced by Anwar Kamal Pasha, starring actor Sultan Rahi in the lead role and with Anjuman and M. Ajmal as the villain.

Cast
 Anjuman
 Sultan Rahi
 Gori
 Zamurrad
 Mustafa Qureshi
 Ilyas Kashmiri
 M. Ajmal
 Bahar
 Sawan
 Saiqa
 Nanha
 Anwar Khan
 Altaf Khan
 Zahir Shah

Track list

All music is by Wajahat Attre and film song lyrics are by Ahmad Rahi, Khawaja Pervaiz and Waris Ludhianvi.

References

External links
 

1986 films
1980s crime action films
Pakistani crime action films
Punjabi-language Pakistani films
1980s Punjabi-language films